Hyperexponential can refer to:

 The hyperexponential distribution in probability.
 Tetration, also known as hyperexponentiation.